In mathematics, Rodrigues' formula (formerly called the Ivory–Jacobi formula) is a formula for the Legendre polynomials independently introduced by ,  and . The name "Rodrigues formula" was introduced by Heine in 1878, after Hermite pointed out in 1865 that Rodrigues was the first to discover it. The term is also used to describe similar formulas for other orthogonal polynomials.  describes the history of the Rodrigues formula in detail.

Statement
Let  be a sequence of orthogonal polynomials satisfying the orthogonality condition

If the weight function  satisfies the following differential equation (called Pearson's differential equation),

then it can be shown that  satisfies a recurrence relation of the form,

for some constants . This relation is called Rodrigues' type formula, or just Rodrigues' formula.

The most known applications of Rodrigues' type formulas are the formulas for Legendre, Laguerre and Hermite polynomials:

Rodrigues stated his formula for Legendre polynomials :

Laguerre polynomials are usually denoted L0, L1, ..., and the Rodrigues formula can be written as

The Rodrigues formula for the Hermite polynomials can be written as

Similar formulae hold for many other sequences of orthogonal functions arising from Sturm–Liouville equations, and these are also called the Rodrigues formula (or Rodrigues' type formula) for that case, especially when the resulting sequence is polynomial.

References

Orthogonal polynomials